Albert Jones  (born 1864) was a Welsh international footballer. He was part of the Wales national football team between 1884 and 1885, playing 4 matches and scoring 2 goals. He played his first match on 9 February 1884 against Ireland and his last match on 23 March 1885 against Scotland.

See also
 List of Wales international footballers (alphabetical)

References

1864 births
Welsh footballers
Wales international footballers
Place of birth missing
Date of death missing
Association footballers not categorized by position